Sarvestan Rural District may refer to:
 Sarvestan Rural District (Bavanat County)
 Sarvestan Rural District (Sarvestan County)